Jocks Pond Outlet flows into the South Branch Grass River near Shurtleff, New York.

References 

Landforms of St. Lawrence County, New York